Jesse Clyde Milan (March 25, 1887 – March 3, 1953) was an American professional baseball player who spent his entire career as an outfielder with the Washington Senators (1907–1922). He was not a powerful batter, but was adept at getting on base and was fleet of foot, receiving the nickname "Deerfoot" for his speed. He set a modern-rules record for stolen bases in a season with 88 in 1912, a mark surpassed three years later by Ty Cobb. Milan was mostly a center fielder.

Like Cobb, Milan batted left-handed and threw right-handed. In 16 seasons with Washington, he batted .285 with 17 home runs and 617 runs batted in over 1982 games. He accumulated 495 stolen bases (tied for 37th all-time with Willie Keeler) and 1004 runs scored. Milan had 2100 hits in 7359 career at bats. He ended with a .353 all-time on-base percentage. Defensively, he recorded a .953 fielding percentage at all three outfield positions.

As a player-manager (1922 only), with the Senators, he was 69–85, a .448 lifetime winning percentage, after which he managed minor league teams and spent 17 seasons (1928–29 and 1938 until his death) as a coach with Washington. His brother, Horace Milan, was briefly his teammate with the Senators.

Milan suffered a fatal heart attack in Orlando, Florida on March 3, 1953, during the Senators' spring training camp, where Milan was beginning what would have been his 18th season as a Washington coach.

See also
List of Major League Baseball career hits leaders
List of Major League Baseball career triples leaders
List of Major League Baseball career runs scored leaders
List of Major League Baseball annual stolen base leaders
List of Major League Baseball career stolen bases leaders
List of Major League Baseball player-managers
List of Major League Baseball players who spent their entire career with one franchise

References

External links

, or Retrosheet, or SABR Biography Project

1887 births
1953 deaths
American League stolen base champions
Baseball players from Tennessee
Birmingham Barons managers
Chattanooga Lookouts managers
Clarksville (minor league baseball) players
Major League Baseball center fielders
Major League Baseball left fielders
Major League Baseball player-managers
Memphis Chickasaws players
Minneapolis Millers (baseball) players
New Haven Profs players
People from Perry County, Tennessee
Shawnee Blues players
Washington Senators (1901–1960) coaches
Washington Senators (1901–1960) managers
Washington Senators (1901–1960) players
Wichita Jobbers players